Philip Lloyd-Smee is an English music journalist, designer and record collector, most widely known for designing music album covers and his Bam-Caruso music label, best known for the Rubble series of albums. Much of Smee's design work was done for CD re-issues of 1960s and 1970s productions by artists such as Moby Grape, Syd Barrett, Elvis Costello, T-Bone Burnett and others. One of his more notable designs is the lettering of the Motörhead logo (the "War-Pig" image is by Joe Petagno).

References

External links
 

English designers
Living people
English music journalists
Year of birth missing (living people)
English male non-fiction writers